John Belchem is an emeritus British professor whose work covers popular radicalism in 19th-century Britain, Irish migration, the Isle of Man, and modern history. He has a special interest in the history of Liverpool. He was made a fellow of the Royal Historical Society in 1987 and is a fellow of the Royal Society of Arts.

Academic career 
Belchem served as head of the School of History, dean of the Faculty of Arts and pro-vice chancellor of the University of Liverpool. He is presently vice-president of the Society for the Study of Labour History.

Belchem's 1985 work on Henry Hunt made a "major contribution to our understanding" of political strategies of progressive movements in 19th-century Britain. Industrialization and the Working Class (1990) was viewed as a "lucid and wide-ranging survey of recent works on working-class movements and their context." Popular Radicalism in Nineteenth-Century Britain (1996) was reviewed as an "excellent work" and a "valuable guide" to the literature on Chartism and the origins of the Labour Party. Merseypride (2000), a collection of essays on the history of Liverpool, is considered to be a "valuable work...of a consistently high standard." His Irish, Catholic and Scouse (2007) was noted to have made a "vital contribution to the historiography of the Irish in Britain."

Other activities 
Belchem worked on Liverpool's successful bid for UNESCO World Heritage Site status in 2004.  In 2017, he was appointed to the Liverpool mayor's task force, which assisted in efforts that ensured the city's status was not lost when under review by UNESCO in 2018.

He was an adviser on Mike Leigh's 2018 film Peterloo.

Selected works

References

External links
 

1948 births
Fellows of the Royal Historical Society
Historians of the United Kingdom
20th-century British historians
21st-century British historians
Living people
Academics of the University of Liverpool
Alumni of the University of Sussex
Historic Society of Lancashire and Cheshire